Christian Aid Mission is an evangelical Christian mission organization that provides aid to indigenous missionary ministries working in countries of poverty or Christian persecution. The organization was founded by Bob Finley, who was one of the early pioneers of supporting missionaries native to their country or region, as opposed to sending foreign missionaries. The international headquarters is in Charlottesville, Virginia.

History 
Bob Finley founded Christian Aid originally as a division of International Students. Its purpose was to assist indigenous mission leaders in lands where foreign missionary work was restricted or illegal. By 1970 the Christian Aid division grew to such an extent that it was decided to create a new organization called Christian Aid Mission. The organization was originally headquartered in Washington DC, and later moved in 1976 to Charlottesville, Virginia, where it is presently headquartered.

References 

Christian missions
Evangelical Christian missions
Christian missions in North America
Christian charities based in the United States
Christian charities
Christian organizations based in North America
Non-profit organizations based in the United States
1970 establishments in the United States